Southern High School may refer to:
Southern High School (Guam), Santa Rita, Guam
Southern High School (Durham, North Carolina)
Southern High School, one of the schools that formed West Central High School, Stronghurst, Illinois
Southern High School (Kentucky), Louisville, Kentucky
Southern High School (Harwood), Harwood, Maryland
Southern High School (Missouri), Ellington, Missouri
Southern High School (Racine, Ohio)
Southern High School (Baltimore), a former secondary school
Southern Local Junior/Senior High School, Salineville, Ohio
Southern Regional High School, Manahawkin, New Jersey
Former name of Digital Harbor High School, Baltimore, Maryland

See also
South High School (disambiguation)